Franklin Street (established ) is located in the Financial District of Boston, Massachusetts. It was developed at the end of the 18th century by Charles Bulfinch, and included the now-demolished Tontine Crescent and Franklin Place.

Former tenants
 George Melville Baker
 Boston Library Society
 Federal Street Theatre
 Abram French & Co., crockery shop, 19th century 
 Holy Cross Church, Boston
 Lee & Shepard

Gallery

See also
 Franklin Place
 State Street Bank Building
 Wigglesworth Building

References

External links

 Library of Congress. Historic American Buildings Survey. Photos of Franklin and Washington St., 1967
 City of Boston. Photo of Washington St. @ Franklin St., February 19, 1949
 Boston Public Library. Flickr. Photo
 Flickr

Streets in Boston
1798 establishments in Massachusetts
History of Boston
Financial District, Boston